The House of Keōua Nui (Hale O Keōua Nui), or simply House of Keōua, is the extended royal family of Ancient Hawaii from which the reigning family of Kamehameha I and Lunalilo were descended.

Origins
A younger branch of the reigning family of Keaweʻīkekahialiʻiokamoku (from the Big Island of Hawaii), the dynastic line was established by Keōua Kalanikupuapaikalaninui Ahilapalapa, who was the father of Kamehameha I. He was the only son of Keeaumoku the Great and High Chiefess Kamakaīmoku.

Keōua's paternal lineage derives from a branch of the royal family of Hawaii Island.  His father, High Chief Keeaumoku-nui of Kohala and Kona, was the second son of Keaweʻīkekahialiʻiokamoku, King of Hawaii Island and his half-sister bride, Kalanikauleleiaiwi. He was known as a pio chief of the highest rank since both his mother and father were pure royal blood. He even outranked his elder brother Kalaninuiamamao, from whom descends the House of Kalākaua and House of Kawānanakoa.  It was because of these two brothers, who contested for the succession to the kingship of the island of Hawaii after Keaweīkekahialiiokamoku's death, that the island was dissolved into a handful independent warring factions.

The ancestry of Keōua's mother, High Chiefess Kamakaʻīmoku, daughter of Kua Nuuanu, Oahu district chief descended from the nobility of Hilo who were descendants of King Umi-a-Līloa's youngest son Kumalae, ruler of Hilo. His mother was also mother of Kalaniōpuu, by Kalaninuiamamao, making him half-brother of Kalaniōpuu and uncle of Kīwalaʻō. Kamakaimoku was also the half-sister of Heulu (through their mother Umiula-a-kaahumanu), the father of Keawe-a-Heulu, another ancestor of the House of Kalākaua.

Kamehameha I of the House of Keōua Nui conquered the separate islands in 1795, uniting them under a single Kingdom of Hawaii. His direct descendants area called the House of Kamehameha. His siblings' houses were then also considered a part of the royal family.

Branches of the House of Keōua Nui

Male Line
House of Laanui-Kalokuokamaile 
Through Prince Kalokuokamaile, eldest son by Kahikikala
Survives today
House of Kamehameha (reigned 1795-1872) 
Through Kamehameha I, second son and first son by Kekuiapoiwa II
Descendants were Ruth Keelikolani, Bernice Pauahi,  and Albert Kunuiakea (illegitimate) 
 House of Kealiimaikai 
Through Kealiimaikai, his third son, second son by Kekuiapoiwa II
Descendants were Peter Young Kaeo, Emma Kaleleonalani, wife of Kamehameha IV; and Albert Kunuiakea, also of the House of Kamehameha. 
 House of Kalaimamahu (reigned 1873-1874) 
Through Prince Kalaimamahu, his fourth son, by Kamakaeheikuli
Descendants were King William Charles Lunalilo and Kuhina Nui Miriam Auhea Kekāuluohi
Survives through line of Miriam Auhea Kekāuluohi Crowningburg

Female Line
Kekuiapoiwa Liliha, daughter by Kalola, 
Descendant, Keōpūolani, married Kamehameha I and mother of Kamehameha II and Kamehameha III
Kiilaweau, daughter by Manona
Descendant, Kekuaokalani, also of the House of Kealiimaikai

Website 
Official Website of the Royal Houses of Keōua Nui

References

 
Royalty of the Hawaiian Kingdom
House of Līloa
Hawaii (island)